Yavari (also Romanized as Yāvarī; also known as Yāwarābād) is a village in Miyan Darband Rural District, in the Central District of Kermanshah County, Kermanshah Province, Iran. At the 2006 census, its population was 95, in 21 families.

References 

Populated places in Kermanshah County